Graeme McIntyre (born 12 October 1940) is a New Zealand former sports shooter. He competed at the 1972 Summer Olympics and the 1976 Summer Olympics.

References

1940 births
Living people
New Zealand male sport shooters
Olympic shooters of New Zealand
Shooters at the 1972 Summer Olympics
Shooters at the 1976 Summer Olympics
Sportspeople from Hastings, New Zealand